Old Stone Shop is a historic commercial building located at Lyme in Jefferson County, New York. It was built in 1838–1839 and is a -story, four-by-two-bay gable-ended building with foundation and walls of coursed quarry-dressed limestone, trimmed in dressed limestone.  It was built as a double blacksmith shop and exhibits the finest commercial masonry architecture in the town of Lyme.

It was listed on the National Register of Historic Places in 1990.

References

Blacksmith shops
Commercial buildings on the National Register of Historic Places in New York (state)
Commercial buildings completed in 1839
Buildings and structures in Jefferson County, New York
National Register of Historic Places in Jefferson County, New York